The Mnet Asian Music Award for Best International Artist (베스트 인터내셔널 아티스트상) is an award presented annually by CJ E&M Pictures (Mnet). It was first awarded at the 1st Mnet Asian Music Awards ceremony held in 1999; international artist Ricky Martin won the award, and it is given in honor for the international performers who achieve global recognition in the music industry.

Winners list

 Each year is linked to the article about the Mnet Asian Music Awards held that year.

Multiple awards for International Artist
As of 2014, only one artist received the title two or more times.

Notes

References

External links
 Mnet Asian Music Awards official website

MAMA Awards